BI Norwegian Business School is the largest business school in Norway and the second largest in all of Europe. BI has in total four campuses with the main one located in Oslo. The university has 845 employees consisting of an academic staff of 404 people and 441 administrative staff. In 2015, BI Norwegian Business School had 18,728 students. BI Norwegian Business School is a private foundation and is accredited as a specialised university institution. It is one of three private specialized universities in Norway, alongside VID and MF.

History
BI Norwegian Business School was founded in 1943 by Finn Øien as Bedriftøkonomisk Institutt, hence the abbreviation BI.

Current activities
BI offers a full set of programmes for bachelor, master and doctoral degrees, as well as executive education and tailor-made programmes for businesses. The teaching languages are English (BBA and graduate programmes) and Norwegian (most undergraduate programmes and custom programmes for local businesses). The school currently participates in exchange programmes with 200 foreign institutions in 45 countries.

The internationally award-winning main campus in Nydalen (Oslo) was designed by Niels Torp, who also designed Gardermoen Airport.

Norsk Kundebarometer
Norsk Kundebarometer (NKB) is a research programme run by BI, with a focus on relations between customers and businesses. Based on an annual survey of Norwegian households, it collects data that may be used for comparison between businesses, comparisons between various industries and comparisons over time.

Campuses in Norway
 Campus Oslo: the main campus is located in Nydalen, Oslo, the capital of Norway. Campus Oslo has more than 14,000 students.
 Campus Bergen: the second-largest campus is located in Bergen, the second-largest city in Norway. Campus Bergen has more than 3,000 students. 
 Campus Stavanger: located in Stavanger, the oil capital of Norway. Campus Stavanger has approximately 1,200 students.
 Campus Trondheim: located in Trondheim, the third-largest city in Norway. Campus Trondheim has approximately 1,900 students.

Activities abroad
BI has educated roughly 1700 students in China through its close relationship with Fudan University in Shanghai and is also the majority shareholder of the ISM University of Management and Economics (previously known as International School of Management) with around 1800 students located in Vilnius and Kaunas in Lithuania.

Degree programmes
Undergraduate (All taught in Norwegian except Business Administration and Data Science for Business)

 Accounting & Auditing
 Finance
 Economics & Management
 Business Administration (Taught in English)
 Business Administration (Taught in Norwegian)
 Data Science for Business, formerly Business Analytics (Taught in English)
 Retail Management
 Creative Industries Management
 Real Estate
 Business & Entrepreneurship
 International Management
 Marketing
 PR & Market Communication
 Economics and Business Law
Graduate (All taught in English, except MSc in Accounting & Auditing and MSc in Law & Business)

 MSc in Applied Economics
MSc in Business Analytics
MSc in Business
 Majors: Accounting & Business Control; Economics; Finance; Marketing; Leadership & Change; Logistics, Operations & Supply Chain Management; Strategy
MSc in Entrepreneurship and Innovation
MSc in Finance
MSc in Leadership & Organisational Psychology
MSc in Quantitative Finance
 QTEM Masters Network
 Programmes: MSc in applied economics; MSc in business analytics; MSc in business – major in economics; MSc in business – major in finance
 MSc in strategic marketing management
MSc in accounting & auditing (taught in Norwegian)
 MSc in law & business (taught in Norwegian)

Executive MBA (EMBA general management in cooperation with Nanyang Business School (Nanyang Technological University), Singapore, IE Business School in Madrid, Spain and Haas School of Business (University of California, Berkeley), Berkeley, California, U.S.)

 EMBA in Energy Management (in cooperation with Nanyang Business School (Nanyang Technological University), Singapore and IFP School, Paris, France)
 EMBA in Shipping, Offshore and Finance (in cooperation with Nanyang Business School (Nanyang Technological University), Singapore
 Executive Master in Energy Management (in cooperation with ESCP Business School and IFP School in Paris, France)
 Part-time MBA in China (in cooperation with Fudan University in Shanghai, China)
Master of Management programmes in International Management, Project Commercial Management and Project Leadership
 Several Executive Master of Management programmes, including a relatively new specialisation in security and cultural understanding created in cooperation with the Norwegian Armed Forces.
 Doctoral Programmes (PhD)

Student organisations
The school has two student organisations, one for the main campus in Oslo and one for the other campuses. The Oslo student organisation is called "" (SBIO). This union was formed in 2005 after the relocation of the three locations in Oslo into one—Nydalen Campus. The three previous unions were Bedriftøkonomisk Studentersamfund (BS), BISON and MØSS. BS was the oldest union, formed in 1964. The union for the other campuses is "BI Studentsamfunn" (BIS). This union was founded on 7 February 1987 and is today the largest student union of a private school in Norway. As of June 2019, the two student organisations have decided to merge into one student body, the name and other details of which will be decided over the summer of 2019.

The student newspaper is named INSIDE and its circulation is 11,000.

The all-male student choir is named UFDA The Choir Boys and was established in 1986.

Ranking
The Financial Times ranks BI as Norway’s best business school for the 6th year running in its European Business School Ranking 2021. BI ranks number 50 out of the 95 schools that make it onto the list.

Financial Times also ranks BI Norwegian Business School‘s Master of Science in Business as one of the world’s 100 best programmes in its latest FT Master in Management 2021 ranking.

Quality accreditations
BI is accredited as a specialised university institution by the Norwegian Agency for Quality Assurance in Education (NOKUT).

BI has also received the following recognitions from private institutions:
 EQUIS accreditation 
 BI was the first Norwegian institution to receive the distinction EQUIS (European Quality Improvement System)
 AMBA accreditation
 BI was the first Norwegian institution to receive the distinction AMBA
 AACSB accreditation

Triple crown

BI Norwegian Business School is the first Norwegian business school that has received the three most prestigious international accreditations. Less than 1 % of business schools worldwide have achieved triple accreditation.

Notable faculty and alumni

Faculty
Hilde C. Bjørnland
Tom Colbjørnsen
Gudmund Hernes
Håkan Håkansson (emeritus)
Torger Reve (emeritus)

Alumni
Svein Richard Brandtzæg, former CEO of Norsk Hydro (2009–2019)
Stein Erik Hagen, Chairman of Orkla Group
Anniken Hauglie, Norwegian Minister of Labour and Social Inclusion
Geir Karlsen, Norwegian Air Shuttle CEO
Sigbjørn Johnsen, former Norwegian Minister of Finance (1990–1996; 2009–2013)
Dag Kittlaus, co-founder of Siri
Jan Tore Sanner, Norwegian Minister of Education and Integration
Petter Stordalen, Norwegian billionaire
Tine Sundtoft, former Norwegian Minister of Climate and the Environment (2013–2015)
Magne Lerø, CEO of Lovisenberg Hospital (1992-1996), CEO and editor-in-chief of Ad Fontes Medier (2004–2009)

See also
 List of business schools in Europe
 Earth for All initiative

References

External links
 BI Norwegian Business School (English site)
 Handelshøyskolen BI (Norwegian site)

 
Education in Oslo
Business schools in Norway
Foundations based in Norway
Educational institutions established in 1943
1943 establishments in Norway
Education in Bærum